Liu Yu (died 128 BC) was a prince of the Western Han Dynasty. He was the fifth son of Emperor Jing. His mother was Consort Cheng (程妃). In 155 BC he was instated as Prince of Huaiyang (淮陽王), but a year later his title was later changed to Prince of Lu (魯王).

Descendants
Liu Yu's descendants included the Three Kingdoms era warlords Liu Biao and Liu Yan and Liu Biao's sons Liu Qi and Liu Cong.

References

Han dynasty imperial princes
127 BC deaths
Year of birth unknown